Hampton (1872–1897) was a British Thoroughbred racehorse and Champion sire. Bred by Lord Norreys, he was sired by 1863 St. Leger Stakes winner, Lord Clifden. His dam was Lady Langden whose sire, Kettledrum, won the 1861 Epsom Derby.

A good stayer, Hampton won races from a sprint distance all the way to those at more than two and a half miles.

At stud, Hampton proved a highly successful sire, earning Champion sire honors in 1887 and Champion broodmare sire honors in 1900. Among his successful runners were four winners of British Classic Races:

 Merry Hampton - 1887 Epsom Derby
 Reve d'Or  - 1887 1,000 Guineas Stakes
 Ayrshire - 1888 Epsom Derby
 Ladas - 1894 Epsom Derby and 2,000 Guineas Stakes

References

1872 racehorse births
1897 racehorse deaths
Racehorses bred in the United Kingdom
Racehorses trained in the United Kingdom
British Champion Thoroughbred Sires
Thoroughbred family 10-a